Skellerup is a village in central Denmark, located in Nyborg municipality on the island of Funen in the Region of Southern Denmark.

History
Skellerup is first mentioned in 1414 as Skeldorp. The church was built between year 1150–1200.

Biskopstorp is a small manor house (Danish: Hovedgård) located south of Skellerup. It was founded in 1765.

References

Cities and towns in the Region of Southern Denmark
Populated places in Funen
Nyborg Municipality
Villages in Denmark